Septoria passerinii is a fungal plant pathogen that infects barley.

References

External links

Fungal plant pathogens and diseases
Barley diseases
passerinii